The 1988 WAFL season was the 104th season of the West Australian Football League in its various incarnations.

The WAFL was laced with several off-field controversies, with chief executive Peter Cumminsky refusing to allow an exhibition match in Vancouver which Subiaco and Swan Districts planned to play on the last Saturday in September, and opposing the WAFC over an Eagles reserves team and maximum transfer fees to VFL clubs being set $13,000 lower than what the clubs said was needed to actually develop the highest standard footballers – in effect funding “destitute” VFL clubs.

The season also saw the end of the exceptionally high scoring of the past decade: for the first time since 1977 the WA(N)FL did not see a single score of over 200 points or a match where both teams scored twenty goals, while the highest score of 27.20 (182) was the lowest since 1974. The average score of 103.97 points per team per game was the lowest since 1975.

Claremont and Subiaco continued to dominate the WAFL this year under coaches Gerard Neesham and Haydn Bunton Jr. (who in 1987 was rumoured to be going to Fitzroy as a replacement for David Parkin) but this time the Lions took the honours with their second convincing Grand Final win in three seasons. There was controversy because the Lions played Laurie Keene after the WAFL ruled on 7 September that a VFL match against Melbourne on the Queen's Birthday, for which Keene travelled to Melbourne an emergency, counted as a WAFL game to determine eligibility for finals. Early-1980s power club Swan Districts, who lost champion coach John Todd to the Eagles and suffered the first of numerous financial crises in the subsequent fifteen years, became the first club since the colts competition began in 1957 to suffer the ignominy of finishing last in all three grades, although expectations the black and whites would suffer another lengthy period in the cellar were not fulfilled in subsequent seasons. South Fremantle, who had lost their last eighteen matches of 1987, convincingly won the WAFL's pre-season competition and despite a second consecutive injury crisis with twenty-four senior list players unavailable as of Round 12, rebounded for their first finals appearance in five seasons due to the return of Maurice Rioli and the discovery of numerous young stars like Peter Sumich, Scott Watters and Stevan Jackson.

Home-and-away season

Round 1 (Easter Monday)

Round 2

Round 3

Round 4 (Anzac Day)

Round 5

Round 6

Round 7

Round 8

Round 9

Round 10

Round 11

Round 12

Round 13

Round 14

Round 15

Round 16

Round 17

Round 18

Round 19

Round 20

Round 21

Ladder

Finals

First semi-final

Second semi-final

Preliminary final

Grand Final

Notes
The only other clubs to finish last in all three grades since 1957 have been Peel Thunder in their inaugural 1997 season and West Perth in 1992. No club has won premierships in all three grades in this time span until Subiaco in 2018 won all three premierships.Billy was the younger brother of former Tiger stars – then with  – Jimmy and Phil Krakouer.As in the VFL, handballing after a free kick was banned in the 1988 and 1989 WAFL seasons, with a ball-up occurring for breaches.

References

External links
Official WAFL website
West Australian Football League Season 1988

West Australian Football League seasons
WAFL